The following is a list of films originally produced or distributed theatrically by Paramount Pictures and released in the 2010s.

See also
 Paramount Pictures
 :Category:Lists of films by studio

References

External links
 Paramount Pictures Complete Library

 2010-2019
American films by studio
2010s in American cinema
Lists of 2010s films